Deyshawn Bond (born August 19, 1994) is an American football guard who is currently a free agent. He played college football at Cincinnati.

Professional career
Bond signed with the Indianapolis Colts as an undrafted free agent on May 4, 2017. Bond made the Colts' final roster as an undrafted rookie, and made his NFL debut in Week 1 against the Los Angeles Rams, starting at center in place of the injured Ryan Kelly. He started the next three games at center before suffering a quadriceps injury in Week 4. He was placed on injured reserve on October 3, 2017.

On September 1, 2018, Bond was waived by the Colts.

References

External links
Cincinnati Bearcats bio
Indianapolis Colts bio

1994 births
Living people
American football centers
Cincinnati Bearcats football players
Indianapolis Colts players
Players of American football from Indianapolis